The Mazourka Formation is a geologic formation in California. It preserves fossils dating back to the Ordovician period.

See also

 List of fossiliferous stratigraphic units in California
 Paleontology in California

References
 

Ordovician California
Ordovician southern paleotropical deposits